Filipe Couto Cardoso (born 2 June 1994) is a Portuguese professional footballer who plays for Penafiel as a midfielder.

Football career
Born in Canidelo, Vila Nova de Gaia in the Porto Metropolitan Area, Cardoso spent most of his youth with local S.C. Coimbrões, while also having some time in the ranks of Boavista F.C. where he played in midfield with Bruno Fernandes. He played six senior seasons for Coimbrões, all in the third tier.

On 19 May 2019, Cardoso made his leap to the professional game, signing a one-year deal with S.C. Covilhã of the LigaPro. He made his debut in the Taça da Liga first round on 28 July in a game against Varzim SC, playing the full game as his team won on penalties after a goalless draw.

On 24 June 2021, Filipe Cardoso signed a three years contract with Marítimo

Personal life
Cardoso graduated in medicine from the University of Porto in 2019, having played for Coimbrões during his studies.

References

External links

1994 births
Sportspeople from Vila Nova de Gaia
University of Porto alumni
Living people
Portuguese footballers
Association football midfielders
S.C. Covilhã players
C.S. Marítimo players
Académico de Viseu F.C. players
F.C. Penafiel players
Primeira Liga players
Liga Portugal 2 players
Campeonato de Portugal (league) players